Roy H. Sengstock (February 3, 1913 – February 1, 1981) was a member of the Wisconsin State Assembly.

Biography
Sengstock was born on February 3, 1913, in Marinette, Wisconsin. He attended the University of Wisconsin-Madison and served in the regular United States Army and the United States Army Air Corps. Before entering politics, he worked as a school teacher and in the insurance business, as well as a factory worker. After his political career, he served as a church business manager. He died on February 1, 1981.

Political career
Sengstock was a Republican and was a member of the Wisconsin State Assembly twice. He began his first term in 1941 but gave it up in 1942 to serve in the military. His second term was from 1947 to 1955. Sengstock announced his retirement from politics in 1956.

References

See also
The Political Graveyard

People from Marinette, Wisconsin
Republican Party members of the Wisconsin State Assembly
Military personnel from Wisconsin
United States Army personnel of World War II
University of Wisconsin–Madison alumni
1913 births
1981 deaths
20th-century American politicians
United States Army Air Forces personnel of World War II